Skyward is a 2018 young adult science fiction novel written by American author Brandon Sanderson. It is the first in a series of four books. It was published by Delacorte Press on November 6, 2018.

Skyward is set in the same universe as Sanderson's short story Defending Elysium, which details events hundreds of years before the events of Skyward. Defending Elysium is available on Sanderson's website and contains spoilers for Skyward.

Plot summary

Spensa is a 17-year-old girl who is part of a group of shipwrecked humans living on a ruined world called Detritus, under constant attack from mysterious aliens called the Krell. Spensa dreams of following in the footsteps of her deceased father, a fighter pilot of the Defiant Defense Force (DDF). However she is barred from any chance at becoming one because her father abandoned his flight in the infamous Battle of Alta, which ended in his own wingmates shooting him down.

In order to get accepted into the flight academy, she and her peers must take an exam to prove their worth. Spensa, who has been preparing for the exam her entire life, has high hopes to pass, as does her longtime friend Rodge. However, on the day of the testing, DDF Admiral Ironsides rigs the exam so that Spensa fails. Angry at her defeat, she surreptitiously retakes the exam after everyone has left. Cobb, her father's former wingmate and an instructor at the academy, spies on her and sees her near-perfect score, so he offers her the opportunity to come train under him.

At the academy, Spensa is introduced to her fellow cadet crew who, at Spensa's recommendation, name themselves the Skyward Flight. Their members are Spensa, Rodge, Kimmalyn (nicknamed Quirk), Hurl, FM, Nedd, Arturo, Morningtide, Bim, and Jorgen (nicknamed Jerkface by Spensa). After training in a virtual reality simulator, they are suddenly called to the battlefield to aid against a Krell incursion. Rodge is left scared, and quits the flight academy to instead become an engineer. Spensa is barred from using academy facilities and quarters, so she occupies a nearby cave, where she discovers an advanced crashed ship with an artificial intelligence computer. Spensa, with the help of a cautious Rodge, begins to work on repairing the ship. In the meantime, Spensa and her cadet flight crew continue to learn and practice new techniques under the guidance of Cobb. Spensa begins to bond with her classmates.

Spensa is eventually able to power the ship, after stealing a power module from Jorgen's hover car, which introduces itself as M-Bot and explains that it was left in the cave by its former owner. However, M-Bot's memory banks are corrupted and it remembers little, beyond orders to lie low and not reveal itself to the public. Skyward Flight is called into action again, and Bim and Morningtide are killed in the subsequent battle. As they further their training, they are called upon more and more, but also lose numbers. Nedd quits after his brothers are killed in combat. Hurl crashes and dies, prompting Kimmalyn to also quit. Arturo is pulled by his worried parents.

Spensa, with Jorgen's help, cremates Hurl at her crash site and recovers the booster from Hurl's ship which Rodge uses to repair M-Bot's flying capabilities. She acquires a recording of the Battle of Alta, which reveals that her father did not desert, but rather turned on and attacked his fellow pilots. Cobb explains that his turning was the result of "the Defect", a mental power which is genetic. Spensa has occasional disturbing visions, which her father supposedly also saw. During her next battle, Spensa is shot down, and ejects in order to save her own life. Ironsides uses this "cowardice" as an excuse to remove Spensa from the Academy.

On graduation day, Ironsides mobilizes all her pilots to battle the Krell for a valuable piece of fallen space salvage. While the pilots are distracted, a Krell bomber launches an attack from the opposite direction. Spensa uses a damaged fighter to assault the bomber, but is shot down again. She crashes, but Cobb brings M-Bot to her, and she uses its advanced capabilities to destroy the bomber and save the DDF. She travels with M-Bot into space, where her Defect allows her to hear and intercept Krell communications. She returns to the planet to report that the Krell are actually a coalition of aliens intent on keeping humans trapped on Detritus, though they are now actively trying to exterminate humanity.

Characters
Call signs are denoted in parentheses. 
 Spensa Nightshade (Spin): The daughter of an infamous coward, Chaser, who is desperate to prove her own bravery and become a pilot. When she is finally accepted into the DDF, Ironsides makes becoming a pilot extremely difficult.  She is also Cytonic.
 Zeen Nightshade (Chaser): Spensa's father, who is Cytonic. Ironsides orders Mongrel to shoot him down.
 Captain Cobb (Mongrel): Spensa's academy flight instructor and the former wingmate of her father. Cobb walks with a permanent limp, curses often, and is cynical of the DDF's current strategy for training new recruits.
 Jorgen Weight (Jerkface): A wealthy student who is named the flight leader for Spensa's Skyward flight. Jorgen's by-the-book approach to piloting leads to constant clashing between him and Spensa, and she nicknames him Jerkface because of this.
 Admiral Judy Ivans (Ironsides): The head of the DDF, a hero of the Battle of Alta. Ironsides has taken a specific interest in hindering Spensa's chances at becoming a pilot.
 Rodge McCaffery (Rigmarole/Rig): Spensa's childhood best friend, who joins the academy and Skyward flight with her, but secretly harbors interest in becoming an engineer.
 M-Bot: Designation MB-1021. A highly advanced starship of a mysterious origin, with an intelligent but quirky AI. Spensa discovers M-Bot in a cave near the DDF's Alta Base, and reactivates him with the help of Rodge.
 Kimmalyn (Quirk): A member of Skyward flight who becomes fast friends with Spensa. Kimmalyn often quotes the Saints, even though she makes up most of what she says. While she is less skilled as a pilot than others, she is an expert markswoman.
 Hudiya (Hurl): A member of Skyward flight with an aggressive yet passionate outlook on flying.
 Freyja (FM): A member of Skyward flight who disagrees with the aggressive, warrior culture that the DDF has created.
 Nedd Strong (Nedder): A member of Skyward flight and friend of Jorgen and Arturo.
 Arturo Mendez (Amphisbaena): A member of Skyward flight and friend of Jorgen and Nedd.
 Magna (Morningtide): A member of Skyward flight who struggles with speaking English.
 Bim: An overeager member of Skyward flight.
 Gran-Gran: Spin's grandmother who tells her stories of Old Earth, which motivates Spin.  Her mother worked on the flagship and took them to Detritus.
 Doomslug: Spensa's bizarre pet alien slug.

Reception
Skyward debuted on the New York Times Best Sellers list as number three in the Young Adult Hardcover category. Publishers Weekly praised the fearless heroine and memorable cast and liked how the cliffhanger ending sets up the next novel.

Sequels
In December 2018, Sanderson confirmed in his yearly "State of the Sanderson" that the second book entitled Starsight was currently finished and awaiting final revisions. It was released on November 26, 2019. Starsight follows Spensa as she continues investigating the mystery of the Krell and her defect. The third book titled Cytonic was released on November 23, 2021 while three novellas co-written by Janci Patterson titled Sunreach, ReDawn, and Evershore were released around the same time. Book 4, Defiant, is expected to complete the series in 2023.

Television 
Universal Television purchased the rights to the series in 2020.

Notes

References

External links
 Skyward – Official website
 Defending Elysium – Free short story set in the same universe (contains spoilers for Skyward)

2018 American novels
2018 science fiction novels
Skyward novels
Delacorte Press books
Victor Gollancz Ltd books